William Merchant Richardson French (1843–1914) was an American engineer. French first came to Chicago in 1867 to pursue a career in civil engineering and landscaping. While working in Chicago, he garnered a national reputation for his lectures and articles on art subjects. In 1878, he became Secretary of The Chicago Academy of Design which was later reorganized as the Chicago Academy of Fine Arts (1879). French became the secretary of this new corporation and its first director in 1885, holding this position until his death in 1914.

Biography

Family
William French was born to: Anne Richardson (1811–1856), daughter of William Merchant Richardson (1774–1838), chief justice of New Hampshire, and Henry Flagg French  (1813–1885) His siblings were Henriette Van Mater French Hollis (1839–1911), Sarah Flagg French Bartlett (1846–1883), and Daniel Chester French (1850–1931)

William French was born of pure New England heritage.  The earliest French ancestor, Edward French, came to the shores of New England in 1630, just 10 years after the establishment of the Plymouth Colony.
His grandfathers on both sides of his family fought in the American Revolution.  His father was a lawyer, judge, and agricultural expert who would later go on to found the Massachusetts agricultural college.  His father excelled in matters of farming and lead to a deep understanding of the early efforts in civil engineering.  William’s mother Anne Richardson was the daughter of William Merchant Richardson of Chester, New Hampshire.  William Merchant Richardson was also the Chief Justice of New Hampshire.

Early life
William, or Will as he was known to his family, was described as “a handsome boy, with black hair and brown eyes. Quick-witted and energetic, a born student, he was up among the first three or four in his class of forty.  He was a very imaginative little boy, very resourceful, with a mind that went like lightning. He was forever urging his little brother on to a new activity.”
The French family would often spend the winter in Washington, DC with family and a month each summer at the family farm in Chester.  William was 13 when his mother died in 1853 after several years of illness.  Three years after Anne Richardson's death, on September 29, 1859, his father married Pamela Mellen Prentice.  In 1860 the family moved to Cambridge, Massachusetts, where they took up residence next to Henry Wadsworth Longfellow. During a  snowstorm while living in Cambridge, Dan and Will sculpted a "mother lioness and her little cub". Mr. Longfellow expressed his admiration for the piece with a large group of observers present.  In 1860 William began his studies at Harvard University and graduated in 1864.

Marriages 

On September 9, 1879, he married Sarah Moody Lovejoy of Princeton, Illinois.  She died in 1881, leaving no children.

Nine years later, French married Alice Helm, daughter of Henry Thomas Helm and Julia (Lathrop) Helm, of Chicago, Illinois.
They had two children: Henry Helm French (1891-1970) and Prentiss French (1894-1989).

Career

After the Chicago Fire destroyed his landscaping practice with H. W. S. Cleveland, French turned to the fine arts and began teaching at the Chicago Academy of Fine Arts. In 1878, he became Secretary for the Chicago Academy of Design that later became the Chicago Academy of Fine Arts (1879), which was then reorganized as the Art Institute of Chicago (1882).  With the name change to the Chicago Academy of Fine Arts, French’s title changed from Secretary to Director, thus making him the first director of the Art Institute.   He oversaw the daily operations of both the school and the museum, working closely with Board President Charles L. Hutchinson.

His investment in the Art  Institute was so intimate that “he knew every stone in the structure, every collection in the galleries, every servant in his employ”, recalled a friend. French also taught a course in Artistic Anatomy for many years.  He was also a founder and charter member of the American Association of Museums.  French shepherded the transition of The Chicago Academy of Design from an Arts organization focused on teaching and the exhibition of local artists into a  world class School and Museum.  While the transition was contentious for some in the community, the School never closed  "It has not been closed for a single day"

French and Board President Charles L. Hutchinson are credited with construction of two of the Art Institute of Chicago buildings after the move from the Pikes Building on State Street in 1882. The organization purchased a lot on the southwest corner of Michigan Avenue and Van Buren Street for $45,000. The existing commercial building on that property was used for the organization's headquarters and a new addition was constructed behind it to provide gallery space and to house the school's facilities. By January 1885 the trustees recognized the need to provide additional space for the organization's growing collection, and, to this end, purchased the vacant lot directly south on Michigan Avenue. The commercial building was demolished, and these facilities opened to great fanfare in 1887.

With the announcement of the World's Columbian Exposition to be held in 1892–93, the Art Institute pressed for a building on the lakefront to be constructed for the fair, but to be used by the Institute afterwards. The city agreed, and the building was completed in time for the second year of the fair.  In preparation for this new building, French and Hutchinson traveled extensively.  The pages of French's travel log are filled with drawings and notes, including some potential lions for the front of the building, notes on meetings with students in Paris, as well as examination ideas.

French’s death was sudden and shocked many.  He was such a beloved figure in Chicago that so many people wished to attend his funeral service that a second service had to be added. Lorado Taff's  tribute  states "To know Mr. French well was a liberal education; to have been counted among his friends will be esteemed by some of us one of the most precious of  life’s privileges.”

Timeline
1843  Born : Exeter New Hampshire
1856  Mother Dies  French is only 13 
1859  Father  marries Pamela Mellen Prentice
1860  Moves to Cambridge MA, lives in rented house in the back of  the Home of Longfellow 
1860  Attendants Harvard University
1864  Graduates from Harvard
1864  May to August  Corporal in 12th Mass unattached
1865  Cambridge,MA  engineering office of J. Herbert She'd of Boston
1867  Chicago,Illinois  office of S.S. Greeley City Surveyor
1868  Albany, Indiana  Asst. Engineer for Ship Canal
1869  Chicago,Illinois  Asst. Engineer board of Public works
1870  Chicago,Illinois independent office
1871  Chicago,Illinois  landscaping and engineering practice with H. W. S. Cleveland
1874  Chicago,Illinois begins to lecture and write about Art
1878  Chicago,Illinois Secretary Chicago Academy of Design
1879  Marries Sarah Moody Lovejoy of Princeton, IL
1881  Wife Sarah Moody Lovejoy dies
1881  Moves to Minnesota in October
1882  Moves to Massachusetts in summer of 1862
1883  Supervising Architect of the Treasury until fall 1884
1884  Returns to Chicago in October and becomes the first Director of The Art Institute  of Chicago.
1889 Visits Europe
1890 Marries Alice Helm of Chicago
1891 Son Henry Helm French was born
1894 Son Prentiss French was born
1914 French Dies in Chicago

References

 

1843 births
1914 deaths
Harvard University alumni
Directors of the Art Institute of Chicago
Phillips Exeter Academy alumni